Qudos Mutual Limited, t/a Qudos Bank, is an Australian mutual bank that provides retail banking products and services, including home loans, personal loans, car loans, credit cards, savings, financial planning assistance, and foreign exchange.

Qudos Bank is an unlisted public company owned by its customers and their elected ten board members. It operates seven branches across Australia. As of October 2020, Qudos Bank's market share in the Australian domestic market was 0.2% of household lending balances and 0.3% of household deposit balances.

History

Early history 
A group of 14 Sydney-based Qantas employees met on 19 August 1959 and resolved to lodge an application to register the Qantas Staff Co-operative Credit Union Limited. The organisation received its registration on 10 September 1959 and began operating on 1 November of the same year.

Membership was initially restricted to Qantas employees based in Sydney, although by 1964, employees of British Airways and Air New Zealand were permitted to join. The Credit Union claimed in 1963 that 20% of Australian-based Qantas staff were members, with this claim increasing to 50% by 1969 and 90% by 1980.

In 1970, the word co-operative was removed from the organisation's name.

Present era

Qantas Credit Union 
The Credit Union started to broaden its reach in 1996 when it commenced lending to non-Qantas employees. By 2011, the constitution posted on the organisation's website allowed existing members to nominate new members rather than membership eligibility depending on employment or family connections. As staff are members under the constitution, they were able to nominate new members, thereby allowing anyone to join the credit union.

On 31 October 2012, the Qantas Staff Credit Union registered the business name Qantas Credit Union, and from late 2012 it traded as the Qantas Credit Union, with the re-branding completed in 2013.

By 2014, the organisation had grown to 90,000 members, although by then, two-thirds of members were not employed by Qantas.

Qudos Bank 
The matter of changing the organisation's name to include the term bank was first mentioned in the 2015 annual report with chairman Mark Boesen stating that the board believed a change was necessary because of confusion around membership eligibility due to the association with Qantas Airways and the use of the term credit union limiting the organisation's growth. During the transition to Qudos Bank, the organisation stated that Qantas requested the organisation cease using the Qantas name and branding similar with or associated with Qantas.

At its 56th annual general meeting, members voted in favour to change its legal name to ‘Qudos Mutual Limited’ enabling it to apply to the Australian Prudential and Regulation Authority for consent to trade as ‘Qudos Bank’. 79.98% of the members voted yes (75% was needed for the vote to pass).

On 4 April 2016, Qudos Bank was created, with the name a twist on the word kudos. The organisation as part of the name change also adopted the new slogan 'so unbank like'.

Corporate affairs

Promotional activities 
At the beginning of 2014 the organisation purchased the naming rights to the Sydney Entertainment Centre, with the venue becoming known as the Qantas Credit Union Arena. The venue was originally intended to be demolished at the end of 2013, although the naming rights deal saw the venue remain open until December 2015.

In April 2016, Qudos Bank secured a multi-year naming rights deal for the Sydney Super Dome, most recently also known as the Allphones Arena.

Products and services
Qudos Bank provides a variety of financial banking products and services, including home loans, credit cards, personal loans and several types of savings accounts, as well as financial planning, general insurance, and foreign currency.

Awards

 2020 Canstar Customer-Owned Bank of the Year
 2020 Mozo Experts Choice Award, Australia's Best Large Mutual Bank
Canstar Outstanding Value for Step Ahead Home Loan
 2008–2009 Money Magazine Award for Service above the Banks
 2011 Mozo People's Choice Awards 3rd in Best Credit Union Award category
 2013 Money Magazine's Best Short Term  deposit Award Non-Bank

See also

References

External links

Credit unions of Australia
Banks established in 1959
Qantas
Financial services companies based in Sydney
Australian companies established in 1959